The World Junior Figure Skating Championships ("World Juniors" or "Junior Worlds") is an annual figure skating competition sanctioned by the International Skating Union in which figure skaters within a designated age range compete for the title of World Junior champion. The ISU guidelines for junior eligibility have varied throughout the years – currently, skaters must be at least 13 years old but not yet 19 before the previous 1 July, except for men competing in pair skating and ice dancing where the age maximum is 21.

This event is one of the four annual ISU figure skating Championships and is considered the most prestigious international competition for juniors. Medals are awarded in the disciplines of men's singles, women's singles, pair skating, and ice dancing.

History
The first World Junior Championships were held in March 1976 in Megève, France, and were originally named the "ISU Junior Figure Skating Championships". In 1977 the championships were held again under the same name at the same place. In 1978 these championships were officially renamed the "World Junior Figure Skating Championships", and held once again in Megève, France. Since then, the location has changed each year.

From its inception until 1980, the World Junior Championships were held in the spring. In 1981, the timing was changed to the November or December of the previous calendar year. In 2000, the timing was changed back to its previous form and the World Junior Championships were once again held in the spring.

Qualifying
Skaters qualify for the World Junior Championships by belonging to an ISU member nation. Each country is allowed one entry in every discipline by default. The most entries a country can have in a single discipline is three. Countries earn a second or third entry for the following year's competition by earning points through skater placement. The points are equal to the sum of the placements of the country's skaters (top two if they have three). Entries do not carry over and so countries must continue to earn their second or third spot every year. If a country only has one skater/team, that skater/team must place in the top ten to earn a second entry and in the top two to earn three entries to next year's championships. If a country has two skaters/teams, the combined placement of those teams must be 13 or less to qualify 3 entries, and 28 or less to keep their two entries. If they do not do so, they only have one entry for the following year.

Which skaters from each country attend the World Junior Championships is at the national governing body's discretion. Some countries rely on the results of their national championships while others have more varied criteria. Selections vary by country.

Skaters must be older than 13 and less than 19 (or less than 21 for male pair skaters and ice dancers) by 1 July of the previous year. For example, to compete at the 2010 Junior Worlds, skaters had to be at least 13 and younger than 19 (or 21) by 1 July 2009. A skater must turn 13 before 1 July in their place of birth, e.g. Adelina Sotnikova was born a few hours into 1 July 1996 in Moscow and was not eligible to compete at the 2010 event.

Medalists

Men

Women

Pairs

Ice dance

Cumulative medal count

See also
 World Figure Skating Championships cumulative medal count
 Figure skating at the Olympic Games
 Major achievements in figure skating by nation
 World Figure Skating Championships

References

Sources

Literature

External links

 2000 Championships
 2001 Championships
 2002 Championships
 2003 Championships